This is a list of lakes of Malaysia. This list encompasses both natural and man made lakes. The lakes are arranged alphabetically within their respective states or federal territories.

States

Kedah
 Dayang Bunting Lake, Langkawi
 Pedu Lake

Malacca
 Ayer Keroh Lake, Ayer Keroh
 Durian Tunggal Lake, Alor Gajah
 Jus Lake, Jasin

Pahang
 Bera Lake
 Chini Lake

Perak
 Banding Lake
 Bukit Merah Laketown Resort, Bukit Merah
 Chenderoh Lake
 Taiping Lake Gardens, Taiping 
 Temenggor Lake

Terengganu
 Kenyir Lake

Federal territories

Kuala Lumpur
 Perdana Lake Gardens
 Titiwangsa Lake Gardens

Putrajaya
 Putrajaya Lake

External links

Tourism Malaysia - Dayang Bunting Lake

Lakes
Lakes
Malaysia